Insider Inc. (formerly Business Insider Inc.) is an American online media company known for publishing Insider (formerly Business Insider) and other media websites. It is a subsidiary of the German publisher Axel Springer SE, the largest in Europe.

History
Business Insider was founded in 2007 by Henry Blodget and Kevin P. Ryan. In 2013, Jeff Bezos led an effort to raise  million for Business Insider Inc. through his investment company Bezos Expeditions. On September 29, 2015, Axel Springer SE announced that it had acquired 88% of the stake in Business Insider Inc. for a reported  million ( million). After the purchase, Axel Springer SE held a stake of approximately 97%, and Jeff Bezos held the remaining shares through Bezos Expeditions. As of 2018, Axel Springer owns a 100% stake in Insider Inc.

Business Insider Inc.'s name was changed to Insider Inc. in December 2017 as the company planned on becoming a general interest news publisher. Nicholas Carlson is Global Editor-in-Chief of Insider. In January 2018, the firm moved its global headquarters in New York City from the Flatiron District to the Financial District. In March 2018, it  launched its first advertising campaign, with the tagline "Get in." The firm started using the Digital Content Ratings of Nielsen Holdings to measure its digital video audience in July 2018.

Websites

Business Insider and Tech Insider 

Business Insider is the original publication of Insider Inc., focusing on business and financial news. The website Tech Insider originally started as a standalone technology-focused news website in 2015, but it was eventually incorporated into a section of Business Insider.

Insider 
In 2015, Business Insider started establishing a social media presence on Twitter and Facebook for Insider, its general news site comparable to BuzzFeed. The website Insider.com launched in May 2016 and focuses on news and lifestyle articles and video.

Markets Insider 
In October 2016, Business Insider started Markets Insider, a globally-focused markets data and news service. Data is provided by Germany-based finance portal Finanzen.net, another Axel Springer holding.

References

External links 

2007 establishments in New York City
American companies established in 2007
Companies based in Manhattan
Mass media companies established in 2007
Mass media companies based in New York City
American subsidiaries of foreign companies
Axel Springer SE
2015 mergers and acquisitions